The Cyber Engineering School (CIS) (formerly the Norwegian Defence School of Engineering) is a defence and military engineering university located in Lillehammer, Norway. The college was established in 1994.

References 

Educational institutions established in 1994
1994 establishments in Norway
Universities and colleges in Norway